The Women's 4 × 200 m Freestyle Relay event at the 10th FINA World Aquatics Championships swam 24 July 2003 in Barcelona, Spain. Preliminary heats swam in the morning session, with the top-8 finishers advancing to swim again in the Final that evening.

At the start of the event, the World (WR) and Championship (CR) records were:
WR: 7:55.47 swum by East Germany on August 18, 1987 in Strasbourg, France.
CR: 7:57.96 swum by China on September 5, 1994 in Rome, Italy

Results

Final

Preliminaries

References

Swimming at the 2003 World Aquatics Championships
2003 in women's swimming